Laelapia is a monotypic moth genus in the family Erebidae. Its single species, Laelapia notata, is found in Madagascar. Both the genus and species were first described by Arthur Gardiner Butler in 1879.

References

External links

Arctiinae
Monotypic moth genera